Zwarte Achtegrond is the first studio album by Lab Waste, an American hip hop duo consisting of Thavius Beck and Subtitle. It was released on Temporary Whatever in 2005.

Track listing

References

External links

2005 debut albums
Lab Waste albums